F2A may refer to:
F2A peptide, a 2A self-cleaving peptides.
Brewster F2A Buffalo